The Blue Diamond Prelude Fillies is a Melbourne Racing Club Group 2 Thoroughbred horse race run under set weight conditions, for two-year-old fillies, over a distance of 1100 metres, held at Caulfield Racecourse in Melbourne, Australia in February. Total prizemoney is A$300,000.

History
The race is a major preparatory race for the rich Blue Diamond Stakes held two weeks later.

Fillies that have captured the Blue Diamond Prelude – Blue Diamond Stakes double: 
Love a Show (1983), Courtza (1989), Lady Jakeo (1993), Alinghi (2004), Samaready (2012), Earthquake (2014), Catchy (2017) and Lyre (2019).

Grade
1982–1985 - Listed race
 1986–2014 - Group 3
 2015 onwards  - Group 2

Distance
 1982–1995 – 1100 metres
 1996 – 1150 metres
 1997 onwards - 1100 metres

Venue
 1982–1995 -  Caulfield Racecourse
 1996 - Sandown Racecourse
 1997–2022 -  Caulfield Racecourse
 2023 - Sandown Racecourse

Winners

 2022 - Revolutionary Miss 
 2021 - Arcaded  
 2020 - Letzbeglam  
 2019 - Lyre
 2018 - Enbihaar
 2017 - Catchy
 2016 - Samara Dancer  
 2015 - Fontiton
 2014 - Earthquake
 2013 - Guelph
 2012 - Samaready
 2011 - One Last Dance
 2010 - Psychologist
 2009 - Rostova
 2008 - Believe'n'succeed
 2007 - Camarilla
 2006 - Nediym’s Glow
 2005 - Dounting
 2004 - Alinghi
 2003 - Halibery
 2002 - Brief Embrace
 2001 - Faiza
 2000 - Mannington
 1999 - Card Queen
 1998 - Piccadilly Circus
 1997 - Rose Of Danehill
 1996 - Merlene
 1995 - Miamore
 1994 - My Flashing Star
 1993 - Lady Jakeo
 1992 - Freedom Fields
 1991 - Raise A Rhythm
 1990 - Zedagal
 1989 - Courtza
 1988 - Startling Lass
 1987 - Midnight Fever
 1986 - Lockley’s Daughter
 1985 - Sudden
 1984 - Rass Dancer
 1983 - Love A Show
 1982 - Formal Invitation

References

Flat horse races for two-year-olds
Horse races in Australia
Caulfield Racecourse